The Tour of Beijing was an annual professional stage bicycle road race held in Beijing, China.

History
Its first edition took place in October 2011, as the penultimate event in the 2011 UCI World Tour. The tour was a partnership between the UCI and the Beijing City Government and covered a period of four years from 2011 to 2014. The event was a legacy of the 2008 Olympic Games and promoted Beijing as a global event city, whilst also promoting the environmental and healthy living outcomes cycling represent.

In September 2014 the UCI announced that the 2014 edition of the race would be the last.

Winners

References

External links
 
 

 
UCI World Tour races
Cycle races in China
Recurring sporting events established in 2011
Recurring sporting events disestablished in 2014
2011 establishments in China
2014 disestablishments in China
21st century in Beijing
Sport in Beijing
Annual sporting events in China
Annual events in Beijing
Defunct cycling races in China